BBCH may refer to:
 Big Brother: Celebrity Hijack
 BBCH-scale, a scale used to identify the phenological development stages of a plant